"Human Race" is a song from New Zealand singer Margaret Urlich. The song was released in November 1992 as the second single from her second studio album, Chameleon Dreams. The song peaked at number 55 in Australia.

Track listing 
CD Maxi (Columbia 658475 4)
 "Human Race" – 4:28
 "Human Race" (Blitzed Out Mix) – 6:25
 "Human Race" (Instrumental) – 5:30

Charts

References

External links 
 Human Race at Discogs

1992 songs
1992 singles
Margaret Urlich songs
Columbia Records singles
Songs written by Margaret Urlich